Galata Cove is the 1.93 km wide cove indenting for 2.18 km the northeast coast of Anvers Island in the Palmer Archipelago, Antarctica.  It is entered south of Frolosh Point and north of Deliradev Point.

The cove is named after the Galata Point on the Bulgarian Black Sea coast.

Location
British mapping in 1980.

Maps
 British Antarctic Territory.  Scale 1:200000 topographic map.  DOS 610 Series, Sheet W 64 62.  Directorate of Overseas Surveys, UK, 1980
 Antarctic Digital Database (ADD). Scale 1:250000 topographic map of Antarctica. Scientific Committee on Antarctic Research (SCAR). Since 1993, regularly upgraded and updated.

References
 Galata Cove. SCAR Composite Antarctic Gazetteer
 Bulgarian Antarctic Gazetteer. Antarctic Place-names Commission. (details in Bulgarian, basic data in English)

External links
 Galata Cove. Copernix satellite image

Bays of the Palmer Archipelago
Bulgaria and the Antarctic